Aulocera saraswati, the striated satyr, is a brown (Satyrinae) butterfly that is found in the Himalayas.

Range
The butterfly is found in the Himalayas from Chitral eastwards across to Sikkim.

Status
In 1932, William Harry Evans reported that the species was common.

Description

The striated satyr is 65 to 75 mm in wingspan.

It is a large powerfully built butterfly which is dark brown above and characterised by a white band across both wings. The white band is broad and straight on the hindwing and reaches the dorsum. The wings have chequered fringes. A dark apical spot or ocellus is present on the forewing. The under hindwing is pale with prominent white striations. The under hindwing is beautifully variegated with brown, white and grey. The tegumen is without hooks.

See also
List of butterflies of India (Satyrinae)

References

Aulocera
Butterflies of Asia
Butterflies described in 1844